Vail is an unincorporated community and census-designated place (CDP) in Blair County, Pennsylvania, United States. It was first listed as a CDP prior to the 2020 census.

The CDP is in northern Blair County, in the eastern part of Snyder Township. It is bordered to the northwest by Bald Eagle Creek and to the southeast by Interstate 99/U.S. Route 220. South Eagle Valley Road (old US 220) is the main road through the community; it leads southwest  to Tyrone and northeast  to Bald Eagle.

References 

Census-designated places in Blair County, Pennsylvania
Census-designated places in Pennsylvania